The Pioneer Prairie Wind Farm, which is located in Iowa along the Minnesota state line in Howard and Mitchell counties, has an installed capacity of 300 MW. Energy from wind farm is delivered to homes and businesses in Tennessee Valley Authority's service area in parts of seven southeastern states.

See also

List of onshore wind farms
List of wind farms in the United States

References

Buildings and structures in Howard County, Iowa
Buildings and structures in Mitchell County, Iowa
Wind farms in Iowa